Tholi Kodi Koosindi is a 1981 Indian Telugu-language film directed by K. Balachander, starring Saritha, Seema, Madhavi, and Sarath Babu with Jeeva as the antagonist. The film was simultaneously made in Tamil as Enga Ooru Kannagi starring Major Sundarrajan. The film won three Nandi Awards.

Plot

Cast

Telugu version 

 Sarath Babu as Venkata Swamy, a police constable
 Saritha
 Seema as Devudamma
 Madhavi as Jabilli
 Jeeva as Rampandu Dora
 Prasanna
 Hanumanthu
 Shantaram
 Dhulipala Seetarama Sastry
 Jayasri
 Satti Babu
 Prasad Babu

Tamil version 
The lead cast was retained for the Tamil version with a slightly altered supporting cast.
Major Sundarrajan
Srikanth

Production 
The film was prominently shot at Veerabhadra Temple, Pattiseema.

Soundtrack 
The songs were composed by M. S. Viswanathan and the lyrics were penned by Acharya Aatreya.
Telugu Track List

Tamil Track List
Soundtrack was composed by M. S. Viswanathan.
Pachaivayal – S. Janaki
Ithaithaan – S. P. Balasubrahmanyam, P. Susheela

Accolades 
Nandi Awards
 Second Best Feature Film – Silver – Kanuri Ranjith Kumar
 Best Audiographer – V. Sivaram
 Best Lyricist – Acharya Aatreya

References

External links 
 

1980 drama films
1980 films
1980s multilingual films
1980s Tamil-language films
1980s Telugu-language films
Films about women in India
Films directed by K. Balachander
Films scored by M. S. Viswanathan
Films with screenplays by K. Balachander
Indian drama films
Indian multilingual films